The 2014 Fergana Challenger was a professional tennis tournament played on hard courts. It was the 15th edition of the tournament for men which was part of the 2014 ATP Challenger Tour, offering a total of $50,000 in prize money, and the fourth edition of the event for women on the 2014 ITF Women's Circuit, offering a total of $25,000 in prize money. It took place in Fergana, Uzbekistan, on 9–15 June 2014.

Men's singles main draw entrants

Seeds 

 1 Rankings as of 26 May 2014

Other entrants 
The following players received wildcards into the singles main draw:
  Rasul Akhmadaliev
  Djurabeck Karimov
  Rizo Saidkhodjaev
  Khumoun Sultanov

The following players entered as an alternate into the singles main draw:
  Artur Dubinski
  Sarvar Ikramov
  Batyr Sapaev
  Shonigmatjon Shofayziyev

The following players received entry from the qualifying draw:
  Sanjar Fayziev
  Temur Ismailov
  Mikhail Ledovskikh
  Vaja Uzakov

The following players entered as a lucky loser into the singles main draw:
  Odil Akramov

Men's doubles main draw entrants

Seeds 

 1 Rankings as of 26 May 2014

Other entrants 
The following pairs received wildcards into the doubles main draw:
  Rizo Saidkhodjaev /  Diyor Yuldashev
  Ahad Ermatov /  Azizbek Lukmanov
  Rasul Akhmadaliev /  Khumoun Sultanov

Women's singles main draw entrants

Seeds 

 1 Rankings as of 26 May 2014

Other entrants 
The following players received wildcards into the singles main draw:
  Akgul Amanmuradova (withdrew)
  Shakhnoza Khatamova
  Polina Merenkova
  Sarvinoz Saidhujaeva

The following players received entry from the qualifying draw:
  Kamila Kerimbayeva
  Varvara Kuznetsova
  Katya Malikova
  Amina Mukhametshina
  Gulchekhra Mukhammadsidikova
  Alisa Tymofeyeva
  Komola Umarova
  Guzal Yusupova

The following player received entry by a lucky loser spot:
  Alina Abdurakhimova

Women's doubles main draw entrants

Seeds 

 1 Rankings as of 26 May 2014

Other entrants 
The following pairs received wildcards into the doubles main draw:
  Shakhnoza Khatamova /  Sarvinoz Saidhujaeva
  Polina Merenkova /  Komola Umarova
  Amina Mukhametshina /  Jamilya Sadykzhanova

Champions

Men's singles 

  Blaž Kavčič def.  Alexander Kudryavtsev, 6–4, 7–6(10–8)

Women's singles 

  Nigina Abduraimova def.  Nao Hibino, 6–3, 6–4

Men's doubles 

 Sergey Betov /  Alexander Bury def.  Nicolás Barrientos /  Stanislav Vovk 6–7(6–8), 7–6(7–1), [10–3]

Women's doubles 

  Hiroko Kuwata /  Mari Tanaka def.  Nao Hibino /  Prarthana Thombare 6–1, 6–4

References

External links 
 Official website

2014 ATP Challenger Tour
2014 in Uzbekistani sport
June 2014 sports events in Asia
2014